Verlioka or wyrlook is an East Slavic fairy tale collected by Alexander Afanasyev in Narodnye russkie skazki (1855–63). It is classified in the Aarne-Thompson-Uther Index as tale type ATU 210*, "Verlioka".

Synopsis
Once there was an elderly couple who had two grandchildren, whom they loved. One day, the grandpa ordered his granddaughter to shoo away the sparrows to protect the crops. Verlioka finds her there and kills her. The grandpa wonders why his granddaughter hasn't come back and sends his youngest grandchild to find her. Verlioka kills her too. Grandpa then sends the grandmother to bring the girls back but Verlioka kills her. After a while, the grandfather goes out to find his family, learns they are dead, and sets out to kill the monster. Along the way, he is joined by talking animals and objects, who attack the monster in his home.

Variants
According to Alexander Afanasyev's note, the tale was collected by Nikolay Tikhorski in "Southern Russia". According to the East Slavic Folktale Classification, there are 3 Russian, 7 Ukrainian, and 1 Belarusian variant. Notemakers  and N. V. Novikov theorize that the typical Ukrainian ending «Вот вам сказка, а мне бубликов вязка» ("Here's a tale for you, and a bunch of donuts for me"; in Bain's translation "So there's a skazha for you－and I deserve a cake or two also."), as well as usage of the vocative case («А вы, добродею, знаете Верлиоку?») possibly suggest that the tale was written in or near Ukraine.

Robert Nisbet Bain included a version of the story in Russian Fairy Tales, a translation of Nikolai Polevoy's work.

American proessor Jack Haney suggested that the tale is "primarily" East Slavic, while German folklorist Hans-Jörg Uther argues that the tale type appears to be "mainly documented in Russia".

Etymology
The Ukrainian language has an adjective "вирлоокий" ('vyrlooky'), meaning "with bulging eyes"; noun "вирло", plural "вирла" ('bulging eyes'). The name has cognates with other Slavic languages:  ('with bulging eyes'),  ('with a damaged eye'), dialectal Smolensk  ('strabismic, crossy-eyed; turning their eyes in all directions'). This may reflect Proto-Slavic *vьrl- ('to turn, to spin') + *oko ('eye').

References 

Russian fairy tales
Slavic legendary creatures
Russian mythology
Ukrainian mythology
Cyclopes
ATU 200-219